Kiss the Bride is a 2007 American romantic comedy film directed by C. Jay Cox and starring Tori Spelling, Philipp Karner and James O'Shea. It had a limited release in April 2008.

Plot
Matt (Philipp Karner) and Ryan (James O'Shea) were best friends in high school, but ten years later, Matt receives an invitation to Ryan's wedding, he is surprised - especially that Ryan's intended, whose name is Alex, is a woman (Tori Spelling). Matt and Ryan had a gay relationship in high school, and Matt has held a torch for Ryan for the past ten years. Described by his co-worker as "so 'My Best Friend's Gay Wedding,'" Matt races off to rescue his former love from this woman who must have trapped him into marriage. Matt and Alex hit it off, Matt and Ryan have some things to work out, and there is a cast of character in-laws (Joanna Cassidy, Tess Harper, Robert Foxworth and Amber Benson).

Cast
Tori Spelling as Alex
James O'Shea as Ryan
Philipp Karner as Matt
Amber Benson as Elly
Joanna Cassidy as Evelyn
Garrett M. Brown as Gerald
Tess Harper as Barbara
Robert Foxworth as Wayne
E. E. Bell as Dan
Steve Sandvoss as Sean
Michael Medico as Chris
Jane Cho as Stephanie
Ralph Cole Jr. as Barry
Brooke Dillman as Virginia
Dean McDermott as Plumber
Elizabeth Kell as Monica
Dean Nolen as Reverend
Connie Sawyer as Aunt Minnie
Les Williams as Larry
Charlie David as Joey
Paul Meacham as Waiter Worthie
Kyle Davis as Officer Harley
Mary Gillis as Saleslady

Critical reception
Nick Pinkerton of LA Weekly called the film "the most ignoble outing in bi-curious screen hijinks since France produced Poltergay."

Soundtrack
"U Found Me" (Levi Kreis, Darci Monet) - Levi Kreis
"Hardly A Hero" (Kreis, Monet) - Levi Kreis
"We're Okay" (Kreis) - Levi Kreis (end credits)
"Drive" - Brian Kent

References

External links
 
 
 
 
 
 

2007 films
2007 LGBT-related films
American LGBT-related films
Films about weddings
Gay-related films
Male bisexuality in film
LGBT-related romantic comedy films
2000s English-language films
2000s American films